A Census County Division (CCD) is a subdivision of a county used by the United States Census Bureau for the purpose of presenting statistical data. A CCD is a relatively permanent statistical area delineated cooperatively by the Census Bureau and state and local government authorities. CCDs are defined in 21 states that do not have well-defined and stable minor civil divisions (MCDs), such as townships, with local governmental purposes, or where the MCDs are deemed to be "unsatisfactory for the collection, presentation, and analysis of census statistics".

CCDs are not governmental units and have no legal or governmental functions. Their boundaries usually follow visible features, such as roads, railroads, streams, power transmission lines, or mountain ridges, and coincide with the boundaries of census tracts. CCDs do not span county lines. Each CCD is given a name based on the name of the largest population center in the area, a prominent geographic feature, the county name, or another well-known local name that identifies its location.

CCDs were first implemented for tabulation of 1950 Census data from the state of Washington. As of the 2010 census, a total of 5,191 CCDs were defined in 20 states.

North Dakota briefly adopted CCDs for the 1970 Census, but soon returned to using MCDs for subsequent censuses. The main reason for abandoning CCDs was financial. As legal units of local government, MCDs could qualify for federal revenue sharing funds, while purely statistical areas like CCDs did not. In 2008, Tennessee changed from using CCDs to using MCDs, leaving 20 states using CCDs as of the 2010 census.

See also
 Census-designated place

References

External links

 Chapter 8: County Subdivisions (PDF),
  U.S. Census Bureau, Geographic Areas Reference Manual 
 State/County Subdivision Outline Maps, U.S. Census Bureau (Inactive)

United States Census Bureau geography